Mohd Yasser (born 24 December 1993) is an Indian track and field para-athlete who competes in the Men's Shotput F46.

Early life 
When Yasser was 8 years old, he lost his arm.

Career 
He represented India at the 2018 Asian Para Games in Jakarta, Indonesia where he won a bronze medal. At World Para Athletics' 2021 Dubai Grand Prix, Yasser won with a gold medal with a performance of 14.58m.

The same was eventually given in 2020.

References

External links
 
 

1993 births
Living people
Indian male shot putters
Paralympic athletes of India